Embodyment was a Christian rock band from Arlington, Texas. The group formed in 1992 and were first known by the name Supplication where they originally played death metal, later turning to deathcore with the release of their debut album Embrace the Eternal, which in turn is credited as one of the earliest deathcore releases of all time. Following their debut full-length the band would completely abandon all their extreme metal elements thereafter, pursuing instead an alternative rock style with their album The Narrow Scope of Things and subsequently became lighter with each proceeding album. 

The band frequently performed shows with touring acts such as Living Sacrifice, Zao, Training for Utopia, P.O.D. and No Innocent Victim.

History
Embodyment started out as a death metal band known as Supplication, with the lineup of Andrew Godwin on lead guitars, Jason Lindquist on vocals, Kevin Donnini on bass, and Jason Donnini on drums. However, quickly thereafter, Jason Domini quit the band and ran away from home. Lindquist knew Mark Garza from school and asked him to play drums. Garza joined the band with the stipulation that his friend Taylor Smith joined the band on rhythm guitars and vocals. After recording their debut demo, Persistent Sin, the band changed their name to Embodyment. Smith would leave the band with Kris McCaddon joining on as vocalist. 

The band had the opportunity to play with bands such as Living Sacrifice, P.O.D., No Innocent Victim, Zao, and Focal Point by this time. The band had recorded and released their second demo known as Corrosion of the Flesh. A self-titled demo would be released soon there after. Jason Stinson of Overcome showed Brandon Ebel of Tooth & Nail Records the band's demo, which led to their signing.

They signed to Solid State Records in 1997 for their debut album, Embrace the Eternal, where they switched to a deathcore style. The album contains mostly new material but also new versions of a couple of the old demos. Solid State later distributed a collection of the early Embodyment death metal demos titled [1993-1996] in addition to releasing a previously unreleased track by the band called “Halo of Winter” on the label’s compilation album, “This Is Solid State Vol. I”.

After kicking vocalist Kris McCaddon out, Sean Corbray joined the band and introduced a markedly different vocal style to the band, evidenced on the followup to Embrace the Eternal, titled The Narrow Scope of Things. This album was the band's first step away from any of the heavier metal subgenres.  Instead, their sound on the album was adjusted to alternative metal with hard rock influences and featured actual singing and some screamed vocal parts rather than any form of death metal vocals.

Embodyment's third and final album for Solid State, Hold Your Breath, continued in the direction seen on The Narrow Scope of Things toward more alternative and hard rock stylings. Hold Your Breath was Embodyment's first album that featured no screamed vocals, only singing vocals.  Embodyment's last album, Songs for the Living, was much the same, showing even less of the dwindling metal influence heard on Hold Your Breath. 

Embodyment had shopped the Songs for the Living material around as an Industry Demo, looking for a new label, but after finding being given the idea that there was more interest than there was, they released it as an album on XS Records. The label was being operated by former Puller vocalist Mike Lewis and Living Sacrifice guitarist and vocalist Bruce Fitzhugh, who the band had much involvement with in their earlier years. Around this time, Garza departed from the band, as he needed to stay home rather than continue to go out on tour. Embodyment disbanded in early 2004 after having partially written a follow up record. According to Godwin, the band was becoming burnt out on the constant touring and even the musical style at the time.

Andrew Godwin, Mark Garza, and Kris McCaddon, most of the lineup of the original Embodyment, have since formed The Famine, a band that returns to the members' metal roots. Godwin would also go on to perform in Pyrithion and his own solo project Hope Deferred. Garza would go on to work in Constant Seas, Lhoist, and recently joining Living Sacrifice as a live member for their 30th anniversary.

In February 2011, the band released a five-song EP, Forgotten, consisting of un-released songs from the Songs for the Living era.

Members
Final lineup
 Sean Corbray – vocals (1999–2004)
 Derrick Wadsworth – bass (2000) rhythm guitar (2000–2002), drums (2002–2004)
 Jason Lindquist – vocals (1992–1994), rhythm guitar (1994–1997, 2000), bass (2000–2004) (Hope Deferred)
 Andrew Godwin – lead guitar (1992–2004) (ex-The Famine, Pyrithion, Hope Deferred)

Previous members
 Kris McCaddon – vocals (1994–1999) (ex-The Famine, ex-Demon Hunter, ex-Society's Finest)
 Taylor Smith – rhythm guitar, vocals  (1992–1994)
 James Lanigan – rhythm guitar (1994–1999)
 Kevin Donnini – bass, backing vocals (1992–1998)
 Mark Garza – drums (1992–2003) (ex-The Famine, Lhoist, Constant Seas)

Timeline

Discography 
Studio albums
 Embrace the Eternal (1998, Solid State, Reviews:HM Magazine, The Phantom Tollbooth)
 [1993-1996] (1999, Independent)
 The Narrow Scope of Things (2000, Solid State, Reviews: The Phantom Tollbooth)
 Hold Your Breath (2001, Solid State, Reviews: Jesus Freak Hideout)
 Songs for the Living (2002, XS Records, Reviews: Jesus Freak Hideout)
 Forgotten EP (2011, Reviews: Jesus Freak Hideout)

Demos
 Persistent Sin (tape under the band name "SUPPLICATION") - 1993
 Corrosion Of The Flesh - 1994
 Embodyment (3-song demo) - 1996
 Industry Demo (an early version of Songs for the Living) - 2002

Non-album tracks

 "Halo of Winter" from This is Solid State Vol. 1 (1998)
 "Breaking News", "And Then Some", "Spilling Over", "The Answer", and "Hindsight", all released online in 2003 and 2004 as parts of what would have been Embodyment's fifth full-length record.
 As of 2011, these five never-before-released songs have been officially released on Apple iTunes and Amazon.com, under the album title "Forgotten".

References

Christian alternative metal groups
Christian rock groups from Texas
Culture of Arlington, Texas
Heavy metal musical groups from Texas
Musical groups established in 1993
Musical groups disestablished in 2004
1993 establishments in Texas
Solid State Records artists
American deathcore musical groups